Bruce Bernard Weatherill, Baron Weatherill,  (25 November 1920 – 6 May 2007) was a British Conservative Party politician. He served as Speaker of the House of Commons between 1983 and 1992.

Family
He was the son of Annie Gertrude (1886–1966) and  Bernard Bruce Weatherill (1883–1962). He married Lyn Eatwell (born 1928) in 1949 and they had three children: Bernard Richard (born 1951), Henry Bruce (born 1953) and Virginia (born 1955). Weatherill was known as "Jack", while his twin sister (baptismal name Margery) was called "Jill".

Tailor

After attending Malvern College, he was apprenticed at age 17 as a tailor to the family firm Bernard Weatherill Ltd, Sporting Tailors, later of 5 Savile Row. He became Director (1948), Managing Director (1958), and Chairman (1967) of the business. After it merged with Kilgour French & Stanbury Ltd., Tailors in 1969, he became Chairman of the combined firm. He resumed his role with the company after his retirement from the House of Commons in 1992, as president until the firm was acquired by others in 2003. Some of the clothes he designed are in the Victoria and Albert Museum and other museum collections.

Following his mother's advice, he always carried his tailoring thimble in his pocket as a reminder of his trade origins and the need for humility, no matter how high one rises. He said that he desired his epitaph to be "He always kept his word."

He was a member of three City of London Livery Companies: the Worshipful Company of Merchant Taylors, the Worshipful Company of Blacksmiths, and the Worshipful Company of Gold and Silver Wyre Drawers.

British Army
Weatherill enlisted as a private in the Oxfordshire and Buckinghamshire Light Infantry of the British Army a few days after the start of World War II. He was commissioned into the 4th/7th Dragoon Guards in May 1941 and reached the rank of captain in 1943. He was attached to 19th King George V's Own Lancers, Indian Army, after being posted to Burma.

While on active service, Weatherill spent time in Bengal, where he embraced the local culture, including learning Urdu and taking up meditation. In response to having witnessed the Bengal famine of 1943, he became a vegetarian.

Weatherill was discharged from the Army in 1946, having served for seven years.

Member of Parliament
He was elected Member of Parliament (MP) on 15 October 1964 for Croydon North East as a Conservative. He became a party whip three years later, and deputy Chief Whip six years after that. He was re-elected seven times for the same seat until his retirement in 1992.

From October 1971 to April 1973, Weatherill was Vice-Chamberlain of Her Majesty's Household, an office usually held by a Government whip, as Weatherill then was. He wrote a letter (hand-carried by messenger, or sent by telegram) to the Queen at the end of each day the House of Commons met, describing the debates, reactions, and political gossip. His letters are believed to have been more entertaining than the debates themselves. Weatherill is the most recent Speaker to have served in Government prior to the Speakership; his successors have all been longtime backbench MPs.

In 1979, Weatherill played a critical role in the defeat of the Labour government in a vote of confidence. As the vote loomed, Labour's deputy Chief Whip, Walter Harrison, approached Weatherill to enforce the convention and gentleman's agreement (otherwise known as pairing) that if a sick MP from the Government could not vote, an MP from the Opposition would abstain to compensate. Labour MP Alfred Broughton was on his deathbed and could not vote, meaning the Government would probably lose by one vote. Weatherill said that the convention had never been intended for such a critical vote that meant the life or death of the Government and it would be impossible to find a Conservative MP who would agree to abstain. However, after a moment's reflection, he offered that he would abstain, because he felt it would be dishonourable to break his word to Harrison. Harrison was so impressed by Weatherill's offer (which would have effectively ended his political career) that he released Weatherill from his obligation, and the Government fell by one vote.

He was sworn of the Privy Council on 8 January 1980.

Speaker of the House of Commons
He was Speaker of the House of Commons from 1983 to 1992. As Speaker at the time television cameras were first allowed to cover proceedings in the House of Commons, he became widely known due to broadcasts of Prime Minister's Questions.

He was the last Speaker to wear a wig while in the chair. He commented that the wig is a wonderful device that allows the Speaker to pretend not to hear some things. He enforced the rights of Parliament to be publicly told of government policies before they were announced to the press or elsewhere. A portrait of him by Robin-Lee Hall hangs in Portcullis House.

Life peer
He stood down in 1992, and was made a life peer on 15 July 1992 taking the title Baron Weatherill, of North East Croydon in the London Borough of Croydon. As is customary for former Speakers, the government put before the House of Commons an address to the Queen, asking that Weatherill be appointed a peer as a mark of "royal favour". Given a rare opportunity to discuss constitutional arrangements relating to the monarch and the Upper House, left-wing members of Parliament forced a debate on the petition.

He sat in the House of Lords as a crossbencher, the convention for former Speakers, irrespective of their previous party affiliation.

In 1993, he was elected alternate Convenor of the Crossbench Peers, and was a convenor from 1995 until 1999. In the House of Lords he made a major contribution to the House of Lords Act 1999 by stitching together the compromise that allowed a limited number of hereditary peers to remain as members.

In 2006, he became Patron of the Better Off Out campaign, calling for Britain to leave the European Union.

Personal life
He became a Freeman of the City of London in 1949, and of the London Borough of Croydon in 1983.

In 1989, he succeeded Lord Blake as High Bailiff and Searcher of the Sanctuary of Westminster Abbey. He resigned both of those offices at the end of 1998 in protest at the manner in which the Dean and Chapter dealt with terminating the employment of the organist. He was succeeded by Sir Roy Strong.

He was Vice-Chancellor of the British charitable Order of St John from 1983 to 2000, and was a knight of the Order from 1992.

An Urdu speaker, he was decorated with the Hilal-i-Pakistan (Crescent of Pakistan, second class) by the Government of Pakistan in 1993.

In 1994, he was named a Deputy Lieutenant of Kent.

He was a member of the European Reform Forum.

Weatherill was an advocate of vegetarianism and appeared at the first Vegetarian Rally in Hyde Park in 1990, alongside Tony Benn. He once stated, "as a life long vegetarian I believe that since man cannot give life he has no moral right to take it away".

In 2005, he announced he was suffering from prostate cancer. On 6 May 2007, he died at the age of 86 in the Marie Curie Community Hospice in Caterham, Surrey, after a short illness.

Bernard Weatherill House, council offices in Croydon, is named after him.

He married Daphne Eatwell in 1949: the couple had three children:
 Bernard Richard Weatherill, QC (1951–2021)
 Henry Bruce Weatherill (b. 1953)
 Virginia (b. 1955), who married the businessman Alan Lovell and lives at the Palace House, Bishops Waltham

Arms

References

Sources

External links 
 
 

 
 
 

1920 births
2007 deaths
People from Guildford
Speakers of the House of Commons of the United Kingdom
Conservative Party (UK) MPs for English constituencies
Crossbench life peers
People educated at Malvern College
Members of the Privy Council of the United Kingdom
Politics of the London Borough of Croydon
British Indian Army officers
4th/7th Royal Dragoon Guards officers
Oxfordshire and Buckinghamshire Light Infantry soldiers
Knights of the Order of St John
Deputy Lieutenants of Kent
UK MPs 1964–1966
UK MPs 1966–1970
UK MPs 1970–1974
UK MPs 1974
UK MPs 1974–1979
UK MPs 1979–1983
UK MPs 1983–1987
Military personnel from London
UK MPs 1987–1992
British Army personnel of World War II
Treasurers of the Household
British twins
Vegetarianism activists
Indian Army personnel of World War II
Life peers created by Elizabeth II